VA-86 has the following meanings:
Attack Squadron 86 (U.S. Navy)
State Route 86 (Virginia)